Lost the Spirit to Rock and Roll (HAC96) is an album by Australian band Sneeze. As with the band's previous record, Sneeze - aka 41 Songs In 47 Minutes (1995) and Nic Dalton's other band, Godstar, this record has a huge cast of ensemble players. All songs are written by Tom Morgan and Nic Dalton, who play on all tracks, except 6 by Morgan/Dalton/Hayes, 7 by Morgan/Dalton/Meyerratken, 13 by Morgan/Dalton/Ciampa, and 18 by Morgan/Dalton/Hayes. The other members listed below are variously scattered across the record.

Track listing
 "Wu-Li"
 "Too Much Man to Be My Woman"
 "Doctor of Love"
 "Deaf Girl, Dumb Guy, Blind Love"
 "(You're Not) The 'Onely One"
 "(Don't Go) Distant"
 "Dancin' Dollars"
 "Tittie Bar"
 "B.U."
 "I Got a Type" 
 "Maybe Moving in Together Wasn't Such a Good Idea"
 "I Want To Be a Woman (Part 2)" 
 "Welcome Back Succubus"
 "Sex Gang of the Year"
 "Casual Cashew Daddy"
 "I Believe in Marrickville (Parts 1 & 2)"
 "Ain't No Love On the Road"
 "I've Lost the Spirit to Rock & Roll"

Personnel
 Tom Morgan
 Nic Dalton
 Lara Meyerratken
 Jess Ciampa
 Nicole Forsyth
 Jen Hoy
 Yi Wang
 Clare Rowe
 Dan Eastabrook
 Martin Taylor
 Greg Gibson
 Tom McElvogue
 Russell Hopkins
 Airena Nakamura
 Bernie Hayes
 Rebecca Henry
 John Encarnacao
 Simon Gibson
 Cameron Bruce
 Christine Hainslin
 Beth Proudly
 Isis Dalton

2001 albums
Sneeze (band) albums